Junior Army is a 1942 American film directed by Lew Landers, starring Freddie Bartholomew, Billy Halop, and Huntz Hall, and released by Columbia Pictures.

Plot
An English refugee, Freddie Hewlett, saves Jimmie Fletcher's life during an altercation with gang leader Bushy Thomas. He then proceeds to try and make a reformed man out of him.

Cast
Freddie Bartholomew as Freddie Hewlett
Billy Halop as James Fletcher
Huntz Hall as Bushy Thomas
Bobby Jordan as Jockey
Boyd Davis as Maj. E.C. Carter 
William Blees as Cadet Capt. Wesley Rogers
Richard Noyes as Cadet Sgt. Sable
Joseph Crehan as Mr. Jeffrey Ferguson
Don Beddoe as Saginaw Jake
Charles Lind as Cadet Pell
Billy Lechner as Cadet Baker
Peter Lawford as Cadet Wilbur
Rudolph Anders as Horner - Nazi Saboteur

Cultural impact
The film is one of the earliest attempts to portray juveniles in a positive light during World War II.

References

External links 

1942 films
American black-and-white films
1942 comedy films
American comedy films
Columbia Pictures films
1940s English-language films
Films directed by Lew Landers
1940s American films